This is a list of many past and current attractions, restaurants, and events at Walt Disney World Resort in Lake Buena Vista, Florida.

Magic Kingdom 

 Astro Orbiter
 The Barnstormer
 Big Thunder Mountain Railroad
 Buzz Lightyear's Space Ranger Spin
 Casey Jr, Splash 'N' Soak Station
 Cinderella Castle
 Country Bear Jamboree
 Disney Animals
 Dumbo the Flying Elephant
 Enchanted Tales with Belle
 Enchanted Tiki Room
 Frontierland Shootin' Arcade
 The Hall of Presidents
 Haunted Mansion
 It's a Small World
 Jungle Cruise
 Liberty Square Riverboat
 Mad Tea Party
 The Magic Carpets of Aladdin
 Main Street Vehicles
 The Many Adventures of Winnie the Pooh
 Mickey's PhilharMagic
 Mickey's Royal Friendship Faire stage show
 Monsters, Inc. Laugh Floor
 Peter Pan's Flight
 PeopleMover
 A Pirate's Adventure ~ Treasures of the Seven Seas
 Pirates of the Caribbean
 Prince Charming Regal Carrousel
 Seven Dwarfs Mine Train
 Space Mountain
 Swiss Family Treehouse
 Tiana's Bayou Adventure (Opening in Late 2024)
 Tom Sawyer Island
 Tomorrowland Speedway
 TRON Lightcycle / Run
 Under the Sea ~ Journey of The Little Mermaid
 Walt Disney World Railroad
 Walt Disney's Carousel of Progress

Epcot 

 Advanced Training Lab
 The American Adventure
 American Heritage Gallery
 Awesome Planet
 Beauty and the Beast: Sing-Along
 Bijutsu-kan Gallery
 Bruce's Shark World
 Canada: Far and Wide
 Disney Animals
 Disney & Pixar Short Film Festival
 Frozen Ever After
 Meet and Greet Anna and Elsa from Frozen
 Gallery of Arts and History
 Gran Fiesta Tour Starring The Three Caballeros
 Guardians of the Galaxy: Cosmic Rewind
 Harmonious
 House of the Whispering Willows
 ImageWorks: The What-If Labs
 International Flower & Garden Festival
 Journey into Imagination with Figment
 Kidcot Fun Stops
 Leave a Legacy
 Living with the Land
 Mexico Folk Art Gallery
 Mission: SPACE
 Palais du Cinema:
 Impressions de France
 Beauty and the Beast: Sing-Along
 Project Tomorrow: Inventing the Wonders of the Future
 Remy's Ratatouille Adventure
 Reflections of China
 SeaBase
 The Seas with Nemo & Friends
 Soarin'
 Spaceship Earth
 Stave Church Gallery
 Test Track
 Turtle Talk with Crush
 Wondrous China (Opening in TBD)

Disney's Hollywood Studios 

 Alien Swirling Saucers
 Beauty and the Beast Live on Stage
 Celebrity Spotlight
 Disney Junior Play & Dance!
 Disney Movie Magic
 Fantasmic!
 For the First Time in Forever: A Frozen Sing-Along Celebration
 Mickey and Minnie's Runaway Railway
 Indiana Jones Epic Stunt Spectacular!
 Jedi Training: Trials of the Temple
 Lightning McQueen's Racing Academy
 Mickey Short Theater
 Millennium Falcon Smugglers Run
 Muppet*Vision 3D
 Rock 'n' Roller Coaster Starring Aerosmith
 Slinky Dog Dash
 Star Tours: The Adventures Continue
 Star Wars Launch Bay
 Star Wars: A Galactic Spectacular
 Star Wars: Rise of the Resistance
 Toy Story Mania!
 The Twilight Zone Tower of Terror
 Vacation Fun - An Original Animated Short with Mickey & Minnie
 Voyage of the Little Mermaid
 Walt Disney Presents

Animal Kingdom 

 Affection Section
 Animal Encounters: Winged Encounters – The Kingdom Takes Flight 
 Avatar Flight of Passage 
 The Boneyard
 Conservation Station
 Cretaceous Trail
 Dinosaur
 Dino Sue
 Discovery Island Trails
 Expedition Everest: Legend of the Forbidden Mountain
 Feathered Friends in Flight
 Fossil Fun Games
 Finding Nemo: The Big Blue.... and Beyond!
 Habitat Habit!
 It's Tough to be a Bug!
 Kali River Rapids
 Kilimanjaro Safaris
 Maharajah Jungle Trek
 Na'vi River Journey 
 The Oasis Exhibits
 Pangani Forest Exploration Trail
 Tree of Life
 TriceraTop Spin
 Wild Africa Trek
 Wilderness Explorers
 Wildlife Express Train
 Festival of the Lion King

Disney Springs

Marketplace 

 Marketplace Carousel
 Marketplace Train Express
 Star Wars™: Secrets of the Empire by ILMxLAB and The VOID

West Side

Restaurants 
 Bongo's Cuban Café
 House of Blues
 Wolfgang Puck Café
 Fulton's Crab House
 Planet Hollywood
 Goofy's Korean Barbecue

Cirque du Soleil 
 La Nouba - Closed on December 31, 2017

Resorts and hotels 
See: Walt Disney World hotels

See also 
 List of Disney theme park attractions
 List of Disney attractions that were never built
 List of Disneyland attractions
 List of former Disneyland attractions

References 

 Official WDW website

External links 
 Walt Disney World attractions
 Official WDW website

Walt Disney World Resort attractions

Walt Disney